Alexander Sutherland (26 March 1852 – 9 August 1902) was a Scottish-Australian educator, writer and philosopher.

Early life and education
Sutherland was born at Glasgow, both parents were Scottish, his father, George Sutherland, a carver of ship's figureheads, married Jane Smith, a woman of character and education. The family came to Australia in 1864 on account of the father's health, and Alexander at 14 years of age became a pupil-teacher with the education department at Sydney.

Career
Coming to Melbourne in 1870 he first taught at Hawthorn Grammar School and then entered on the arts course at the University. He maintained himself largely by scholarships and graduated with honours in 1874. For two years he was a mathematical master at Scotch College, Melbourne, and in 1877 founded Carlton College. He was an excellent schoolmaster, and the school was so successful that 15 years later he felt himself able to retire and devote himself to literature.

The banking crisis of 1893, however, affected his position so much, that he was obliged to do a great deal of journalism for the Argus and Australasian. Sutherland did a large amount of literary work. He was responsible for the first volume only of Victoria and its Metropolis, published in 1888, an interesting history of the first 50 years of the state of Victoria. In 1890 he published Thirty Short Poems, the cultured verse of an experienced literary man, but his most important book was The Origin and Growth of the Moral Instinct, which appeared in 1898 in two volumes. Sutherland had long brooded over this book and was greatly pleased at receiving the commendation of some of the leaders of philosophic thought in England. Generally the book was well received both in Europe and the United States. With his brother, George Sutherland, he wrote a short History of Australia, which attained a sale of 120,000 copies, and he collaborated with Henry Gyles Turner in a useful volume, The Development of Australian Literature (1898). His undoubted powers as a teacher gave value to his text book, A New Geography, and other works of that kind. He contributed on scientific subjects to the Nineteenth Century, and did a large amount of lecturing on literature and science in Melbourne.

Career in politics
In 1897 he became a candidate for parliament, but his methods were too guileless and straightforward to ensure success . In 1898, he went to London as representative of the South Australian Register, but found the climate oppressed him and returned to Australia towards the end of 1899. He continued his journalistic work in Melbourne, and in March 1901 was an unsuccessful candidate for the southern Melbourne seat in the first federal parliament. Soon afterwards he was appointed by the council of the University of Melbourne to the position of registrar.

Later life and death
The university was passing through a difficult time after a period of slack administration, and Sutherland had to work very hard. On the death of Professor Morris while away on leave in Europe, Sutherland took over his lectures on English literature. The burden of the extra work was too great for Sutherland who did not have a strong constitution, and he died suddenly on 9 August 1902. His widow, a son and three daughters survived him. His daughter, Margaret Sutherland, became well known as a musician and composer.

References

External links
 
 
 

1852 births
1902 deaths
Australian schoolteachers
Australian historians
Australian philosophers
Scottish emigrants to colonial Australia
Writers from Glasgow
Writers from Melbourne